Brett Geeves (born 13 June 1982) is an Australian retired cricketer, who played for the Tasmanian Tigers in Australian domestic cricket, and for the Glenorchy Cricket Club in Tasmanian club cricket. He was also selected by the Delhi DareDevils in the Indian Premier League. Primarily a right-arm opening bowler, Geeves scored 99 not out on two occasions in the Sheffield Shield.

In 2011, he was forced to retire from domestic and international cricket due to a series of back injuries. He now works in government programs and provides commentary for local media.

International career

Geeves made his One Day International debut against Bangladesh on 30 August 2008, taking 2 for 11. In March 2009 he was called up to the Australian squad touring South Africa after Doug Bollinger suffered an abdominal-muscle strain while training in the nets.

References

External links

 
 Cricket Australia Profile

1982 births
Australian cricketers
Australia One Day International cricketers
Australia Twenty20 International cricketers
Delhi Capitals cricketers
Living people
Tasmania cricketers
Cricketers from Tasmania